Hannah Starling (born 12 June 1995 in Leeds, England) is a British former diver. At the 2012 Summer Olympics, she competed in the Women's synchronized 3 metre springboard.

Former world champion diver Edwin Jongejans has trained her since 2004.

Starling won the synchronized 3 metre event at the British Championships in 2010 (with Grace Reid) and 2014 (with Rebecca Gallantree) and at the British National Cup in 2012 (with Rebecca Gallantree). She won the 1 metre springboard event at the British National Cup in 2011.

Starling finished in second place for the British diving team (20th overall in the world) at the 18th FINA Diving World Cup held in London, England in February 2012.

In 2014 Starling finished third in the 3 metre springboard event at the Commonwealth Games in Glasgow. She announced her retirement from the sport in 2015.

Diving achievements

References

British female divers
Living people
Olympic divers of Great Britain
Divers at the 2012 Summer Olympics
1995 births
Sportspeople from Leeds
Divers at the 2014 Commonwealth Games
Commonwealth Games medallists in diving
Commonwealth Games bronze medallists for England
Medallists at the 2014 Commonwealth Games